Thomas de Cormont (born towards the end of the twelfth century) was a French Gothic Era master-mason and architect who worked on the Cathedral of Notre-Dame in Amiens following the death of its chief architect, Robert de Luzarches. There is speculation that Thomas may have been Robert's disciple.

In addition to Amiens Cathedral, he is also believed to have worked contributed to both the Saint-Germain-en-Laye and the Sainte-Chapelle. According to analysis and evidence, Thomas de Cormont was responsible for the completion of the upper nave, chevet aisle vaults and windows, and ambulatory sometime in the 1230s.

His son, Renaud de Cormont, continued his work Amiens Cathedral in the 1240s.

References

13th-century French architects
Gothic architects
Year of birth unknown
Year of death unknown
12th-century births